Stephen Peter Morgan  (born 25 November 1952) is an English businessman, investor, and philanthropist. He is the founder of the housebuilders Redrow plc, a former chairman of Wolverhampton Wanderers F.C., and founder of the charitable Steve Morgan Foundation.

Early life
Morgan was born in Garston, Liverpool, on 25 November 1952. The son of a plant hire operator, he moved home nine times during his childhood and consequently changed school nine times. His parents moved to Colwyn Bay when he was 13, and he was educated at Colwyn High School and Liverpool Polytechnic (now Liverpool John Moores University), where he completed a two-year diploma course.

Redrow
Morgan entered the business world, aged 21, during the 1974 recession. His then employers, Wellington Civil Engineering, were on the verge of going out of business. Wellington was offered a new job laying sewers in Penley and Morgan offered to take it over. He went on to develop this company into the housebuilder Redrow plc. Under his chairmanship, Redrow was floated on the London Stock Exchange in 1994, ultimately becoming a FTSE 250 Company.

The 1990s saw Morgan also invest in hotels, developing St David's Park Hotel in North Wales and Carden Park in Cheshire, eventually merging his interests into the De Vere Group.

In November 2000, after 26 years, Morgan stepped down as Redrow chairman, although his company, Bridgemere, remained one of its largest shareholders. In 2001 Morgan founded Brownfield specialist company Harrow Estates plc. In March 2009, however, Redrow's shares having dropped to less than 100p, Morgan was urged by Toscafund Chief Executive Martin Hughes to return and he rejoined the board as chairman after having rebuilt his stake in the company, in order to address the significant losses suffered by Redrow during the financial crisis. In a 2012 interview with the BBC's economics correspondent, Sarah Dickens, Morgan discussed his reasons for returning to Redrow, which by the time of the interview, had turned the inherited £140 million loss into a £43 million pre-tax profit.

After returning to Redrow, Morgan refocused the company's building projects on providing family homes by launching the New Heritage collection.

In February 2017, following Redrow's revelation of a 35% increase in pre-tax profits to £140 million, during a Radio 4 interview, Morgan defended the construction industry. He called the government's housing White Paper “disappointing”, and criticised its proposals for forcing house builders to surrender land if construction had not started within two years, which would dissuade small house builders. Morgan also announced in February 2017 when the firm acquired Derby house builder Radleigh Homes, which will form the basis of a new regional division, Redrow East Midlands, that Redrow expected to deliver a turnover of £1.9 billion by 2019, and an operating margin of 19.5%.

In September 2017, it was announced that Morgan would "ease back" to a non-executive chairman role with Redrow. In that year the shares in Redrow rose 4.3% after the housebuilder reported record results for the fourth year in a row - the company announced that pre-tax profits for the year to 30 June jumped 26% to £315 million, with revenues up 20% at £1.66 billion. Operating profit rose again in 2018 to £382 million. On 18 October 2018 Redrow announced its 100,000th customer since Morgan found the business.

In November 2018, Morgan announced his retirement from Redrow in March 2019 with John Tutte taking over as executive chairman. Morgan reportedly left the company in 2019 with a value of £2.2 billion.

Wolverhampton Wanderers
A shareholder and lifelong supporter of football club Liverpool, Morgan attempted several times to take full control, most notably when he made an offer in 2004 which reportedly valued the club at £61 million. This was rejected, as the board felt that the offer undervalued the club. When Liverpool was eventually sold to Tom Hicks and George Gillett in 2007, the reported value was in excess of £170 million.

In 2007, an opportunity arose to purchase Wolverhampton Wanderers, a club which he had previously regarded as his "second club". Morgan agreed to buy the club from Sir Jack Hayward for a token fee of £10 on condition he invested £30 million in the club.
 The takeover was formally completed on 9 August 2007 when Morgan became chairman. On handover, Hayward stated that Morgan had "had a heart transplant from Liverpool to Wolverhampton". In May 2009, Wolves were promoted, as champions, to the Premier League, but were relegated back to the Championship in May 2012 after three seasons. After suffering a second successive relegation in the 2012–13 season, Wolves played in League One in the 2013–14 season and finished as champions with a record 103 points, returning to the Championship. In 2014 Morgan oversaw the opening of the club's multi-million pound Compton Park training complex.

In September 2015, Morgan stepped down from the board and announced the club was for sale. In July 2016, it was confirmed that the Chinese company Fosun International had bought the parent company of the club, W.W. (1990) Limited, from Steve and Ross James Morgan (25% share capital in total) and his company Bridgemere UK plc (75% share capital) for an estimated £30 million. Morgan later revealed in an interview that he had turned down other offers for the club but had accepted Fosun's offer because of the company's commitment to invest £100m into the club. Morgan signed off with an open letter to Wolves fans in which he described his time owning the club as "an honour and a privilege that I will never forget".

Philanthropy
In 2001 he founded the Steve Morgan Foundation, to which he has donated over £300 million, and which has provided support to more than 650 charities to date and funding ongoing awards. In 2022, the Foundation made the biggest ever philanthropic donation to diabetes research in the UK, £50 million.

Following the outbreak of COVID-19 in early 2020, Morgan pledged £1 million a week to charities to help vulnerable members of society cope with the fallout of the virus. That support was credited as a lifeline for hundreds of charities affected by Covid-19 particularly food banks, support for the homeless, domestic abuse charities and mental health organisations. The Foundation reported in December 2020 that Morgan had given over £27 million to charities impacted by COVID-19.

His donations and beneficial projects have included:

In February 2017, Morgan donated an estimated £207 million in shares to the Foundation.
As part of its “Smiley Bus” scheme, the Foundation has donated over 80 adapted mini-buses to schools, charities and community groups. So far, £3 million has been committed to donating specialist disabled equipment (including Smiley Buses) as part of its Enable programme.
Morgan was the instigator behind creating Wolverhampton's ‘The Way’ youth zone, donating £2 million to help fund the project, which seeks to positively impact over 4,000 young people in Wolverhampton a year. Morgan chaired The Way until stepping down in September 2016 after the sale of Wolves.
In September 2017 Morgan donated $1m to the Barbuda Relief Fund which was set up to support relief efforts in the wake of Hurricane Irma.
In February 2018 it was announced that the Foundation would work with Maggie's Centres to build two new cancer care centres; one on the Wirral and the other at the Royal Liverpool Hospital with the Wirral centre, at Clatterbridge Hospital, set to open in early 2021.
In September 2018, in an interview with the Sunday Times, he and his wife Sally revealed that they had donated £3 million to the Juvenile Diabetes Research Foundation (JDRF). JDRF has since benefited from further donations, including a £1 million donation in December 2019 and a share of the £20m received by charities following Morgan's agreement to match-fund a £10m award from the DCMS.
Morgan has agreed to build two cancer hospices for Maggie's Centres.
In 2022 the Steve Morgan Foundation partnered with airline Wizz Air and three other not-for-profit organisations Choose Love, The Shapiro Foundation and the Ukraine Sponsorship Pathway UK (USPUK) in order to offer 10,000 free flights to the United Kingdom to Ukrainian refugees.

Honours

In 1992, Morgan was appointed Officer of the Order of the British Empire (OBE) for services to the construction industry.

He is a fellow of the Institute of Builders, and holds honorary fellowships and doctorates at Cardiff University, Liverpool John Moores University, Glyndŵr University., Wolverhampton University, and University of Chester.

Morgan was appointed Commander of the Order of the British Empire (CBE) in the 2016 Birthday Honours for philanthropic services.

Personal life
Morgan and his first wife Pamela divorced in 2000. They have two children together. Morgan also has a son with Janet Hill. Pamela Morgan Bell was included in the Sunday Times Rich List for 2007 and 2008, with a net worth of £110 million. In 2002, Morgan married his second wife, Fiona Boustead. They divorced in 2013. In 2016, he married businesswoman Sally Toumi, with whom he operates the Steve Morgan Foundation.

Morgan owns a second home on the Caribbean island of Antigua. The 2019 Sunday Times Rich List estimated his net worth at £950 million, an increase of £8 million from 2018. The 2020 edition of the Rich List estimated his net worth at £751 million, a fall of £199 million on the previous year. Morgan is a lifelong Liverpool FC supporter, having followed the club from the days of Bill Shankly.

In February 2019, Morgan received an apology and damages from the Daily Mail after being falsely accused of buying Redrow properties at an undervalue. He commented, having brought a libel claim at the High Court in London, "It is a shame that it has taken 18 months for justice to be served and for the Daily Mail to recognise its wrongdoing, however, I am pleased the record has now been set straight and that we may now draw a line under this issue." The damages were paid towards adapted minibuses for two special needs schools.

References

External links
Bridgemere corporate website
Morgan Foundation

1952 births
Living people
Alumni of Liverpool John Moores University
British construction businesspeople
Businesspeople from Liverpool
Commanders of the Order of the British Empire
English billionaires
English chief executives
English civil engineers
English football chairmen and investors
English investors
English philanthropists
Liverpool F.C. chairmen and investors
Wolverhampton Wanderers F.C. directors and chairmen
People from Garston